Village View, also known as the Mansion House, is a historic home located at Emporia, Virginia. It was built about 1815, and substantially improved in 1826.  It is a two-story, double pile, Federal style frame dwelling.  It has a two-story rear ell added in the 20th century. It features a two-story front porch and exterior end chimneys. Village View served as a Confederate headquarters during the American Civil War and was used later by the owners of a boys' academy.

It was listed on the National Register of Historic Places in 1982.

References
 

Houses on the National Register of Historic Places in Virginia
Federal architecture in Virginia
Houses completed in 1815
Houses in Emporia, Virginia
National Register of Historic Places in Emporia, Virginia
1815 establishments in Virginia